"Wanted" is a song by Swedish production duo NOTD and American singer Daya, it was released on 27 September 2019, via Polydor Records and Universal Music Sweden.

Background
When accepted an interview, Daya expressed she wrote the song with Delacey and Sam Martin by piano two years ago: "NOTD took it from there and entirely transformed it. They took all the outdated parts of it and gave them new life."

Composition
The song is written in the key of F major, with a tempo of 96 beats per minute.

Track listing

Credits and personnel
Credits adapted from AllMusic.

 Samuel Brandt – composer, primary artist
 Tobias Danielsson – composer, primary artist
 Daya – primary artist, composer
 Delacey – composer
 Samuel Denison Martin – composer
 Isaiah Tejada – composer

Charts

Weekly charts

Year-end charts

References

2019 songs
2019 singles
NOTD songs
Daya (singer) songs
Songs written by Sam Martin (singer)
Polydor Records singles
Universal Music Group singles
Songs written by Daya (singer)